The Stepford Wives is a 1972 satirical "feminist horror" novel by Ira Levin. The story concerns Joanna Eberhart, a talented photographer, wife and young mother who suspects that something in Stepford's environment is changing the wives from free-thinking, intelligent women into compliant wives dedicated solely to homemaking. As her friends slowly transform Joanna realises the horrific truth.

The book has had two feature film adaptations, both using the same title as the novel: the 1975 version, and the 2004 remake. Edgar J. Scherick produced the 1975 version as well as all three of the television sequels. Scherick was credited posthumously as producer of the 2004 remake.

In a March 27, 2007, letter to The New York Times, Levin said that he based the town of Stepford on Wilton, Connecticut, where he lived in the 1960s.

Plot 
The premise involves the married men of the fictional Fairfield County town of Stepford, Connecticut and their fawning, submissive, impossibly beautiful wives. The protagonist is Joanna Eberhart, a talented photographer newly arrived from New York City with her husband and children, eager to start a new life. As time goes on, she becomes increasingly disturbed by the submissive wives of Stepford who seem to lack free will, especially when she sees her once independent-minded friends, fellow new arrivals to Stepford, turn into mindless, docile housewives following a romantic weekend. Her husband, who seems to be spending more and more time at meetings of the local men's association, mocks her fears.

As the story progresses, Joanna becomes convinced that the wives of Stepford are being poisoned or brainwashed into submission by the men's club. She visits the library and researches the pasts of Stepford's wives, discovering that some of the women were once feminist activists and very successful professionals and that the leader of the men's club is a former Disney engineer and others are artists and scientists, capable of creating lifelike robots. Her friend Bobbie helps her investigate, going so far as to write to the Environmental Protection Agency (EPA) to inquire about possible toxins in Stepford. However, eventually, Bobbie is also transformed into a docile housewife and has no interest in her previous activities.

At the end of the novel, Joanna decides to flee Stepford, but when she gets home, she finds that her children have been taken. She asks her husband to let her leave but he takes her car keys. She manages to escape from the house on foot and several of the men's club members track her down. They corner her in the woods, and she accuses them of creating robots out of the town's women. The men deny the accusation and ask Joanna if she would believe them if she saw one of the other women bleed. Joanna agrees to this, and they take her to Bobbie's house. Bobbie's husband and son are upstairs, with loud rock music playing as if to cover screams. The scene ends as Bobbie brandishes a knife at her former friend.

In the story's epilogue, Joanna has become another Stepford wife gliding through the local supermarket, having given up her career as a photographer, while Ruthanne (a new resident of and the first black woman in Stepford) appears poised to become the town's next victim.

Themes

The reaction of men to feminism 
Michelle Arrow says: "not only a satire of male fears of women’s liberation, but a savage view of heterosexual marriage. In this telling, a man would rather kill his wife and replace her with a robot than commit to equality and recognise her as a whole person."

The role of women in the home 
There are many feminist themes in The Stepford Wives. The novel tackles the role of women in the nuclear family and the control they have over their bodies by allowing the readers to observe what happens in Stepford when Joanna moves in. Before the women in Stepford turned into lifeless, docile robots, they were avid activists and successful career women who had lives outside of being a wife. However, the men in Stepford were opposed to this, turning their wives into robots and reducing their only purposes in life down to serving their husbands.

Consent
 
The theme of consent is tackled in The Stepford Wives franchise. The reason why the men in Stepford make their wives into submissive robots is that they are afraid of losing control over their wives. The similarity between sex robots and the women in Stepford is that they are both lifeless and docile, hence the men do not need consent in order to fulfill their sexual desire.

Adaptations 

In 1975, the book was adapted into a science fiction thriller directed by Bryan Forbes with a screenplay by William Goldman and starring Katharine Ross, Paula Prentiss, Peter Masterson and Tina Louise. While the script emphasis is on gender conflict and the sterility of suburban living, and thus the science fiction elements are only lightly explored, the movie still makes it much clearer than the book that the women are being replaced by some form of robot. Goldman's treatment of the book differed from that of Forbes, with the robots closer to an idealized Playboy Bunny; it has been claimed that the look was scrapped when Forbes' actress wife Nanette Newman was cast as one of the town residents.

A 1980 television sequel was titled Revenge of the Stepford Wives. In this film, instead of being androids, the wives underwent a brainwashing procedure and then took pills that kept them hypnotized. In the end, the wives broke free of their conditioning and a mob of them killed the mastermind behind the conspiracy.

In a 1987, a television sequel/remake titled The Stepford Children, both the wives and the children of the male residents were replaced by drones. It ended with the members of the conspiracy being killed.

A 1996 version called The Stepford Husbands was made as a third television movie with the gender roles reversed and the men in the town being brainwashed by a female clinic director into being perfect husbands.

Another film titled The Stepford Wives was released in 2004. It was directed by Frank Oz and featured Nicole Kidman, Bette Midler, Matthew Broderick, Christopher Walken, Roger Bart, Faith Hill, Glenn Close and Jon Lovitz. It was intended to be more comedic than the previous versions. The new script by screenwriter Paul Rudnick has the women being transformed into carefully controlled cyborgs rather than being murdered and replaced with robots. The script culminates in a twist ending in which it is a powerful woman (played by Glenn Close) who is the evil mastermind of the injustice perpetrated on other women, and features a "Stepfordized" male partner of a gay town resident. Unlike the original novel and most of the adaptations, the perpetrators of the conspiracy neither die nor get away with their crimes; the victims are freed from their control programming and subject their husbands to a taste of their own medicine as restitution. 

Both versions were filmed in various towns in Fairfield County, Connecticut, including Redding, Westport, Darien, New Canaan, Wilton and Norwalk. The 1975 version had several locations in the Greenfield Hill section of Fairfield, Connecticut, including the Eberharts' house and the Greenfield Hill Congregational Church. Additional scenes from the 2004 movie were filmed in Bedminster, New Jersey, with extras from surrounding communities.

In language

"Stepford wife" 
The term "Stepford wife" entered common use in the English language after the publication of Levin's book.  It is generally used as a derogatory term for a submissive and docile wife who seems to conform blindly to the stereotype of an old-fashioned subservient role in relationship to her husband.

See also 
 Culture of Domesticity

References

External links 
 
 

1972 American novels
1972 science fiction novels
American horror novels
Novels by Ira Levin
Novels set in Connecticut
American novels adapted into films
Fictional gynoids
Random House books
Women in Connecticut
Science fiction novels adapted into films
Satirical novels